Haig Bertrand Oundjian (born 16 May 1949) is an English former figure skater. He is the 1971 European bronze medalist and a three-time British national champion. He competed at the 1968 Winter Olympics in Grenoble, placing 17th, and at the 1972 Winter Olympics in Sapporo, placing 7th.

Oundjian later served as the chairman of the National Ice Skating Association and vice-chairman of Watford F.C. In 2019 he became joint-chairman of Bruno's Magpies.

Results

References

1949 births
British male single skaters
English male single skaters
English people of Armenian descent
Figure skaters at the 1968 Winter Olympics
Figure skaters at the 1972 Winter Olympics
Olympic figure skaters of Great Britain
Living people
Sportspeople from London
European Figure Skating Championships medalists